The Film Development Board is a government body responsible for the development and promotion of motion picture sector in Nepal. The board is under the Ministry of Information and Communication Nepal.

History 
Film Development Board (FDB) was established on 30 June 2000 by the Government of Nepal according to the Clause 10a of Motion Picture (Production, Exhibition and Distribution) Act amended on 20 November 1991 with the mandate of first, look after the research, planning and development, production, library and archive, film festivals and international relations. Second, distribution, exhibition and monitoring and supervision of the films produced for the commercial purpose.

List of Chairperson

See also
Cinema of Nepal

References

Film organisations in Nepal
Government agencies of Nepal
2000 establishments in Nepal